George Smith Waterfield (2 June 1901 – 1988) was an English professional association footballer who played as a defender.

References

1901 births
1988 deaths
People from Swinton, Greater Manchester
English footballers
Association football defenders
Burnley F.C. players
Crystal Palace F.C. players
Nelson F.C. players
English Football League players
England international footballers